Alpiodytes is a genus of beetles in the family Carabidae, containing the following species which are endemic to Italy:
Alpiodytes penninus (Binaghi, 1936)
Alpiodytes ravizzai Sciaky, 1985

References

Scaritinae